Nils "Nicke" Evert Oscar Bergström (28 Mars 1921 – 27 December 2001) was a Swedish bandy and football player. In football, Bergström played 5 Allsvenskan games with AIK. In bandy, Bergström played with Nässjö IF and became the top-tier Division 1 topscorer in the 1952, 1955, and 1958 seasons.

References

Swedish bandy players
Swedish footballers
Nässjö IF players
AIK Fotboll players
Association footballers not categorized by position
1921 births
2001 deaths